The men's 100 metre butterfly competition of the swimming events at the 2011 World Aquatics Championships was held on July 29 with the heats and the semifinals and July 30 with the final.

Records
Prior to the competition, the existing world and championship records were as follows.

Results

Heats
66 swimmers participated in 9 heats.

Semifinals
The semifinals were held at 19:01.

Semifinal 1

Semifinal 2

Final
The final was held at 18:42.

References

External links
2011 World Aquatics Championships: Men's 100 metre butterfly entry list, from OmegaTiming.com; retrieved 2011-07-23.

Butterfly 100 metre, men's
World Aquatics Championships